Joseph Kay or Kaye may refer to:
Joseph Kay (architect) (1775–1847), English architect
Joseph Kay (economist), English economist
Joseph Kay (writer) Canadian television writer and producer
Joseph Kaye (cricketer), English cricketer
Sir Joseph Kaye, 1st Baronet (1856–1923) of the Kaye baronets